Cyril McNamara (3 April 1908 – 27 October 1966) was an  Australian rules footballer who played with South Melbourne in the Victorian Football League (VFL).

Notes

External links 

1908 births
1966 deaths
Australian rules footballers from Victoria (Australia)
Sydney Swans players